Rama Khan is a fictional character appearing in American comic books published by DC Comics. He first appeared in JLA #62 and was created by Joe Kelly and Doug Mahnke.

Fictional character biography
Rama Khan's earliest appearance is 1,004 BC, with no information given about his exact birth date. In the land of Atlantis, he became the joint ruler of Atlantis, sharing the post with Gamemnae. Khan had earlier journeyed to Atlantis from the faraway land of Jarhanpur to assemble a group of heroes to protect the realm. However, Manitou Raven subsequently learned that Gamemnae had manipulated the other members of this "League of Ancients" to stop the Justice League ruining her own vision of the future, Gamemnae killing the rest of the League of Ancients after the Justice League's apparent death and absorbing Khan and others into herself. 

Later on, in the 21st century, Rama Khan reappeared in Jarhanpur as its elemental defender (the Justice League confronted this version of Rama Kahn before facing the ancestor allied with Gamemnae). When he kidnapped a boy and separated him from his mother because the child was his spiritual successor, Khan found himself in conflict with the Justice League. He broke Wonder Woman's lasso of truth, resulting in reality unravelling as the nature of existence began to be defined by belief rather than truth as the Lasso was a symbolic representation of truth itself; the Earth was the center of the universe for two weeks before anybody noticed, it became flat for a few hours, and the Moon was even made of cheese at one point. Although Jarhanpur's nature as living land protected it from this chaos, the League, resolved to stop this before the world became defined by the beliefs of every individual person on the planet, confronted Rama Khan once again, during which Wonder Woman accepted why the Lasso had broken; when she'd confirmed that Rama Khan was telling the truth about the need for a successor to his position, her denial of this truth had caused the lasso to break and cause a subsequent breakdown of the rules of truth. With this self-discovery, Jarhanpur helped Diana to repair the Lasso, restoring reality and undoing the initial damage. As an aftereffect of this restoration, the land rejected Rama Khan; he was now focused more on preserving his position than respecting the wishes of the land, which wished to help Diana and her teammates rescue its people.

Powers and abilities
Rama Khan's abilities are largely based on his birthplace, Jarhanpur. With the aid of magic, Rama Khan can turn a handful of its soil into fire, granite, or wine. Khan is also super strong, immortal, and is a great magician.

In other media
Rama Khan appears in the fifth season of Supergirl, portrayed by Mitch Pileggi. This version is a high-ranking Leviathan operative from Krypton's sister planet Jarhanpur who possesses seismic wave generation, geokinesis, and Kryptonite manipulation, came from to Earth during the Mesozoic, and caused a number of cataclysmic events, such as the biblical flood, the eruption of Mount Vesuvius, the 526 Antioch earthquake, the Yellow River Flood, and the 1970 Bhola cyclone.

See also
 Atlantis

References

Further reading
The DC Comics Encyclopedia, 2004, DK Publishings

DC Comics characters who use magic
Comics characters introduced in 2002
DC Comics characters with superhuman strength
Characters created by Joe Kelly
Characters created by Doug Mahnke
Fictional characters with earth or stone abilities
Fictional characters with gravity abilities
Fictional prehistoric characters
DC Comics supervillains
Fictional characters with immortality
DC Comics aliens
DC Comics Atlanteans